The Iwate at-large district (岩手県選挙区, Iwate-ken senkyo-ku) is a constituency of the House of Councillors in the Diet of Japan. It consists of Iwate Prefecture and elects two Councillors, one every three years, making it one of the decisive single-member districts.

The Councillors currently representing Iwate are:
 Eiji Kidoguchi (elected as an independent in 2016 and joined the People's Life Party immediately after the election; term ends in 2022).
  (elected as an independent in 2019; term ends in 2025).

Elected Councillors 

Party affiliations as of election day; #: resigned; †: died in office.

Recent election results

References 
House of Councillors: Alphabetical list of former Councillors

Iwate Prefecture
Districts of the House of Councillors (Japan)